The Lipscomb Bisons men's soccer team represents Lipscomb University in all NCAA Division I men's college soccer competitions. The Bisons play in the ASUN Conference, where they are the two-time defending A-Sun champions.

Postseason

NCAA tournament results

References

External links 
 

 
1979 establishments in Tennessee